Edd Sorenson (born October 17, 1959) is a technical cave diver known for numerous rescues of lost or trapped divers in the underwater caves of Florida, particularly in Vortex Spring and Blue Spring State Park.
He is well known for being one of the most experienced cave divers in the world.

Career
Sorenson began diving in 1995 and within a few years expanded to cave diving. In 1999, he joined International Underwater Cave Rescue and Recovery (IUCRR) as one of the original members and later founded Cave Adventurers dive center in Marianna, Florida in 2003 near Florida Caverns State Park.

Sorenson became a local hero in 2012 after four rescues that year and was featured in the Duracell series Quantum Heroes. For his efforts in 2012, Sorenson was awarded the Diver’s Alert Network Hero Award, Heroic Merit Awards and the Instructor Trainer of the Year from the Professional Scuba Association International.

Due to his experience with the Vortex Spring cave system, Sorenson was involved in the 2010 search for missing diver Ben McDaniel. After an extensive search Sorenson believed that McDaniel was not trapped in the cave because of lack of evidence and disturbance to the cave commonly seen after a diver passes through. He stated, "The last place I searched was pristine, without a mark that a diver had been there. It would be impossible to go through that restriction without making a mark on the floor or ceiling. He's not in there."

In February 2019 Sorenson, along with Mike Young, successfully conducted two body recoveries from Dudú Lagoon in the Dominican Republic.

In April 2019 Sorenson successfully rescued Josh Bratchley, a British cave diver who assisted in the rescue of 12 boys and their soccer coach from a Thai cave, from Mill Pond Cave in Flynn's Lick, Tennessee.

References

External links

1959 births
Living people
American cavers
American underwater divers
Cave diving explorers
People from Marianna, Florida